Herbert Joseph Sendek Jr. (born February 22, 1963) is an American college basketball coach who is the current men's basketball head coach at Santa Clara.

Early life
Herbert Joseph Sendek, Jr. of Slovak descent, grew up in Pittsburgh and attended Penn Hills High School. He starred as a point guard in basketball, lettering two years, serving as team captain, and earning All-East Suburban honors. He graduated with a perfect 4.0 grade-point average and was valedictorian of the Class of 1981. Sendek's father, Herb Sr., was a teacher and basketball coach at both the high school and junior college levels.

College career
He played college basketball at Carnegie Mellon University, where he was a three-year letterman. He graduated summa cum laude in 1985 with a bachelor's degree in industrial management and earned the Carnegie Merit Scholarship.

Assistant coach
In 1984–85, Sendek served as an assistant coach at Central Catholic High School in Pittsburgh.

Sendek served as a graduate assistant coach at Providence in 1985, then as an assistant coach at Providence from 1987 to 1989. He then served as an assistant coach at Kentucky under Rick Pitino from 1989 to 1993.

Head coach

Miami (Ohio)
In 1993, Sendek accepted his first college head coaching job, at Miami University in Oxford, Ohio, succeeding Joby Wright, who left to become head coach at Wyoming. In his first season, 1993–94, the Redskins (now RedHawks) posted a 19–11 record and finished second in the Mid-American Conference (MAC).

In 1994–95, Miami improved to 23–7 overall, winning the MAC championship with a 16–2 record and earning a spot in the NCAA tournament. In the Midwest Regional, #12 seeded Miami shocked #5 seeded Arizona 71–62, before losing to #4 seeded Virginia in overtime in the Second Round.

In Sendek's third season at Miami, 1995–96, the team went 21–8 and finished third in the MAC. Miami earned a berth in the NIT, losing a first-round game to Fresno State, 58-57. Sendek was named the 1995 MAC Coach of the Year.

North Carolina State
After three seasons at Miami, Sendek was hired at North Carolina State in 1996, becoming the youngest head coach in the Atlantic Coast Conference (ACC). He immediately improved upon the Les Robinson era, winning 17 games for the program's first winning record in six years. The Wolfpack ended the season winning eight of 11 games, advanced to the finals of the ACC Tournament, and earned a trip to the postseason in the NIT.

Sendek coached NC State to the NCAA tournament five consecutive years from 2002 until 2006 (tying the school record). He won his 100th game at NC State in 2002. In 2004, Sendek won ACC Coach of the Year and Julius Hodge, one of Sendek's most prized recruits during his NC State tenure, was named ACC Men's Basketball Player of the Year. In 2005, NC State upset defending champion Connecticut in the Second Round of the NCAA tournament to advance to the Sweet 16, NC State's deepest run into the tournament during Sendek's years.

Due in part to an 8–38 record against Duke and North Carolina combined with failing to win an ACC championship, fan and booster support was in steep decline. This ultimately played a factor in Sendek deciding to leave NC State for the head coaching vacancy at Arizona State.

Arizona State
On April 3, 2006, Sendek accepted the head coaching job at Arizona State. While his first year record in the Pac-10 was a paltry 2–16, recruiting went well: ASU signed Jerren Shipp, a highly regarded high school guard, point guard Derek Glasser from the LA Area, and Eric Boateng, a McDonald's All-American who transferred from Duke. His second recruiting class included highly touted McDonald's All-American James Harden and point guard Jamelle McMillan (a four-star recruit and the son of former NC State Basketball star Nate McMillan).

The 2007–08 season was a great improvement over the previous season. Sendek and freshman guard James Harden led the Sun Devils to fifth place in the Pac-10 Conference, including a sweep of rival Arizona. Arizona State was rewarded with a number 1 seed in the 2008 NIT. The 2008–09 team led by Pac-10 Player of the year Harden improved to a 25–10 record and advanced to the second round of the NCAA tournament.

After the departure of Harden for the NBA, the Sun Devils program finished 2nd in the Pac-10 during the 2009–10 season in what was a weak Pac-10 Conference.  That year, the conference RPI was so weak, it was the first time the 2nd place Pac-10 team didn't get an at-large invitation to the NCAA tournament. The Sun Devils instead were given a #1 Seed in the NIT and lost 67-66 to the Jacksonville Dolphins in Tempe. With three returning seniors, there were high expectations for the 2010–11 season with an expected run at the Pac-10 title again. However, the Sun Devils finished in last place with a record of 12–19 (4–14).

The 2011–12 season was anticipated to be better with the addition of newcomer and 2010–11 Arizona High School Player of the Year Jahii Carson. However, Carson failed to gain NCAA clearance to play. The season became even more troublesome as Sendek dismissed his leading scorer, Keala King, from the team on January 7, 2012 for undisclosed reasons. The season resulted in a tenth-place finish in the new Pac-12. A sixth-place finish followed in 2012–13 with a trip to the NIT. In 2013–14, ASU finished with a 21–12 record and a loss in the Second Round of the NCAA tournament.

On March 24, 2015, Sendek was fired by Arizona State after an 18–16 record, losing to USC in the Pac-12 tournament, and a trip to the NIT.

Santa Clara
On March 28, 2016, Sendek accepted the head coaching job at Santa Clara, replacing recently fired coach, Kerry Keating who was fired after nine years.
On January 12, 2022, Sendek got his 500th career win against Pacific.

Personal life
Sendek is married to Melanie (Scheuer); they have three daughters.

Sendek was inducted into the Penn Hills Hall of Fame and into the East Boros Chapter of the Pennsylvania Hall of Fame.

Head coaching record

References

External links

Santa Clara profile
 Arizona State profile
NC State profile

1963 births
Living people
American men's basketball coaches
American men's basketball players
American people of Slovak descent
Arizona State Sun Devils men's basketball coaches
Basketball coaches from Pennsylvania
Basketball players from Pittsburgh
Carnegie Mellon Tartans men's basketball players
College men's basketball head coaches in the United States
Kentucky Wildcats men's basketball coaches
Miami RedHawks men's basketball coaches
NC State Wolfpack men's basketball coaches
Point guards
Providence Friars men's basketball coaches
Sportspeople from Pittsburgh
Tepper School of Business alumni